This article shows all participating women's volleyball squads at the 1994 Goodwill Games, held from July 21 to 27, 1994 in Saint Petersburg, Russia.

















References

B
B
Goodwill Games
Volleyball at the Goodwill Games
International volleyball competitions hosted by Russia
Goodwill Games